Serafimerlasarettet (Seraphim Hospital), popularly known as Serafen,  was the first modern hospital in Sweden. It was located in Kungsholmen in Stockholm and active from 1752 to 1980. The current building still houses the local emergency department of Serafen.

The hospital is mentioned in Carl Michael Bellman's 1790 song "Ge rum i Bröllopsgåln din hund!", Fredman's Epistle no. 40, where even the priest at the wedding party steals from the collection meant for the hospital; and in Epistle 48, "Solen glimmar blank och trind", where it is one of the sights seen from Ulla Winblad's boat as she returns from Hessingen in Lake Mälaren to Stockholm.

References

Defunct hospitals in Sweden
1752 establishments in Sweden
1980 disestablishments in Sweden
18th century in Sweden
19th century in Sweden
Infrastructure completed in 1725
Hospital buildings completed in the 18th century
Buildings and structures in Stockholm
History of Stockholm
Hospitals established in the 1750s
Hospitals disestablished in 1980
18th century in Stockholm